Hafnium(IV) chloride is the inorganic compound with the formula HfCl4. This colourless solid is the precursor to most hafnium organometallic compounds. It has a variety of highly specialized applications, mainly in materials science and as a catalyst.

Preparation
HfCl4 can be produced by several related procedures:
The reaction of carbon tetrachloride and hafnium oxide at above 450 °C;
HfO2  +  2 CCl4  →   HfCl4  +  2 COCl2
Chlorination of a mixture of HfO2 and carbon above 600 °C using chlorine gas or sulfur monochloride:
HfO2  +  2 Cl2  +  C   →   HfCl4  +  CO2
Chlorination of hafnium carbide above 250 °C.

Separation of Zr and Hf
Hafnium and zirconium occur together in minerals such as zircon, cyrtolite and baddeleyite. Zircon contains 0.05% to 2.0% hafnium dioxide HfO2, cyrtolite with 5.5% to 17% HfO2 and baddeleyite contains 1.0 to 1.8 percent HfO2. Hafnium and zirconium compounds are extracted from ores together and converted to a mixture of the tetrachlorides.

The separation of HfCl4 and ZrCl4 is difficult because the compounds of Hf and Zr have very similar chemical and physical properties. Their atomic radii are similar: the atomic radius is 156.4 pm for hafnium, whereas that of Zr is 160 pm. These two metals undergo similar reactions and form similar coordination complexes.

A number of processes have been proposed to purify HfCl4 from ZrCl4 including fractional distillation, fractional precipitation, fractional crystallization and ion exchange.   The log (base 10) of the vapor pressure of solid hafnium chloride (from 476 to 681 K) is given by the equation: log10 P = −5197/T + 11.712, where the pressure is measured in torrs and temperature in kelvins. (The pressure at the melting point is 23,000 torrs.)

One method is based on the difference in the reducibility between the two tetrahalides. The tetrahalides can in be separated by selectively reducing the zirconium compound to one or more lower halides or even zirconium. The hafnium tetrachloride remains substantially unchanged during the reduction and may be recovered readily from the zirconium subhalides. Hafnium tetrachloride is volatile and can therefore easily be separated from the involatile zirconium trihalide.

Structure and bonding
This group 4 halide contains hafnium in the +4 oxidation state. Solid HfCl4 is a polymer with octahedral Hf centers. Of the six chloride ligands surrounding each Hf centre, two chloride ligands are terminal and four bridge to another Hf centre.  In the gas phase, both ZrCl4 and HfCl4 adopt the monomeric tetrahedral structure seen for TiCl4. Electronographic investigations of HfCl4 in gas phase showed that the Hf-Cl internuclear distance is 2.33 Å and the Cl...Cl internuclear distance is 3.80 Å. The ratio of intenuclear distances r(Me-Cl)/r(Cl...Cl) is 1.630 and this value agrees well with the value for the regular tetrahedron model (1.633).

Reactivity

The compound hydrolyzes, evolving hydrogen chloride:
HfCl4 + H2O   →   HfOCl2  +  2 HCl

Aged samples thus often are contaminated with oxychlorides, which are also colourless.

THF forms a monomeric 2:1 complex:
HfCl4  +  2 OC4H8  →   HfCl4(OC4H8)2

Because this complex is soluble in organic solvents, it is a useful reagent for preparing other complexes of hafnium.

HfCl4 undergoes salt metathesis with Grignard reagents.  In this way, tetrabenzylhafnium can be prepared.

With alcohols, alkoxides are formed.
HfCl4  +  4 ROH   →   Hf(OR)4  +  4 HCl
These compounds adopt complicated structures.

Reduction
Reduction of HfCl4 is especially difficult. In the presence of phosphine ligands, reduction can be effected with potassium-sodium alloy:
2 HfCl4  +  2 K  +  4 P(C2H5)3   →   Hf2Cl6[P(C2H5)3]4  +  2 KCl
The deep green dihafnium product is diamagnetic. X-ray crystallography shows that the complex adopts an edge-shared bioctahedral structure, very similar to the Zr analogue.

Uses
Hafnium tetrachloride is the precursor to highly active catalysts for the Ziegler-Natta polymerization of alkenes, especially propylene. Typical catalysts are derived from tetrabenzylhafnium.

HfCl4 is an effective Lewis acid for various applications in organic synthesis. For example, ferrocene is alkylated with allyldimethylchlorosilane more efficiently using hafnium chloride relative to aluminium trichloride. The greater size of Hf may diminish HfCl4's tendency to complex to ferrocene.

HfCl4 increases the rate and control of 1,3-dipolar cycloadditions. It was found to yield better results than other Lewis acids when used with aryl and aliphatic aldoximes, allowing specific exo-isomer formation.

Microelectronics applications
HfCl4 was considered as a precursor for chemical vapor deposition and atomic layer deposition of hafnium dioxide and hafnium silicate, used as high-k dielectrics in manufacture of modern high-density integrated circuits.  However, due to its relatively low volatility and corrosive byproducts (namely, HCl), HfCl4 was phased out by metal-organic precursors, such as tetrakis ethylmethylamino hafnium (TEMAH).

References

Chlorides
Hafnium compounds
Metal halides